Alphaea impleta is a moth of the family Erebidae. It was described by Francis Walker in 1865. It is found in China (Tibet), Nepal and India (Sikkim, Assam).

References

Moths described in 1865
Spilosomina
Moths of Asia